In business, an affiliate is an entity that owns less than a majority stake in another's stock. Affiliations can also describe a type of relationship in which at least two different companies are subsidiaries of a larger parent company. Most recently, affiliation has been a popular form of marketing for eCommerce companies.

Corporate structure 
A corporation may be referred to as an "affiliate" of another when it is related to it but not strictly controlled by it, as with a subsidiary relationship, or when it is desired to avoid the appearance of control. This is sometimes seen with companies that need to avoid restrictive laws (or negative public opinion) on foreign ownership.

Affiliate marketings 
The process where an organization will pay commission to an affiliate to promote their products either through a website, blog, email or social media. Affiliate marketing brings the power of network effects to brand outreach, using current customers and ambassadors as a channel for marketing outreach.

See also 
 Affiliate marketing
 Associate company
 Franchising
Affiliate Program

References 

 Affiliate marketing